Sir Henry Bruce Meux, 3rd Baronet (pronounced "Mews") (1856–1900) was an English baronet, the son of Sir Henry Meux, 2nd Baronet (1817–1883), a brewer and politician.

Career
Educated at Eton College and Trinity College, Cambridge, Meux was joint-manager, with Lord Tweedmouth, of Meux's Brewery Company Ltd which they registered as a public company in 1888.

Meux had a considerable estate, including  on the Marlborough Downs. He commissioned James Whistler to paint three portraits of his wife, Valerie, Lady Meux. At Lady Meux's request, Henry purchased from the City of London the Temple Bar Gate, which they preserved at their Theobalds Park estate.

Meux died childless in 1900, and his wife inherited his share of the brewery and his estate.

References

External links 

1856 births
1900 deaths
Baronets in the Baronetage of the United Kingdom